Diploicia canescens is a widespread species of lichenized fungus. It is found throughout much of the world, occurring on every continent except Antarctica.

Taxonomy
Diploicia canescens was first described by James Dickson in 1785 as Lichen canescens. It was later assigned to a host of genera before being moved to its current genus, Diploicia, by Abramo Bartolommeo Massalongo in 1852. It is the type species for the genus. Some mycologists assign this species (and all other members of the genus Diploicia) to the genus Diplotomma, but genetic analysis suggests that this would make Diplotomma a polyphyletic group, and that the Diploicia species are more appropriately assigned to a separate genus. There are two subspecies, D. c. canescens and D. c. australasica, which differ in the chemistry of their thallus. D. c. canescens contains canesolide and buellolide, while D. c. australasica does not.

The genus name Diploicia derives from the Greek word diploos, meaning "two-fold" – a reference to its two-celled ascospores. The specific name canescens is Latin for "gray-haired" or "white with old age".

Description
Diploicia canescens is a crustose lichen with lobed margins, a growth type known as "placodioid". The thallus, which can range in color from white to very pale gray, is typically darker in the center and very white-pruinose on the marginal lobes. The center of the thallus is generally covered with soralia, which are flour-like and pale to slightly yellow in color. The photobiont of D. canescens is a green algae (chlorococcoid).

Like many lichens, D. canescens disperses primarily by means of symbiotic vegetative propagules; most are covered with extensive mats of soralia. Apothecia are rare, but where they occur are black, lecideine (meaning that they have no thalline margin), and measure 0.3–1 mm in diameter. Each ascus contains eight spores. Each spore is brown with a cell wall (called a septum) that divides it into two cells; it measures 10–15 μm x 5–8 μm. Observations in Ireland found apothecia only between the months of August and December. The production of spores increased over that time period, with peak germination occurring in October and November.

Habitat and distribution

Diploicia canescens has been found on every continent but Antarctica, though it is less common on some continents than others. It was only added to the North American list in 1984; previous records actually referred to a different species.

Unlike some lichens, D. canescens occurs in abundance on both calcareous and siliceous substrates. It occurs on rocks, old walls, and tree trunks,  favoring nutrient-enriched areas, such as birds' perching stones.

Ecology
Diploicia canescens contains the chemical compounds atranorin and diploicin, plus minor amounts of chloroatranorin, dechlorodiploicin, isofulgidin, and minor or trace amounts of dechloro-O-methyldiploicin and secalonic acids A, B, C. Derivatives of diploicin have been shown, in vitro, to be active against bacterial species including Mycobacterium smegmatis, Corynebacterium diphtheriae (mitis), and M. tuberculosis.

The overall status of D. canescens has not been evaluated by the International Union for Conservation of Nature. It is impacted by the presence of sulfur dioxide, and is slow to recolonize areas where such pollution has declined.

Diploicia canescens is attacked by lichenicolous fungi, including Arthonia diploiciae. As it often grows in nutrient-enriched areas, it is sometimes overgrown by alien green algae (green algae not incorporated into the lichen itself).

References

Caliciales
Lichen species
Lichens described in 1785
Lichens of Africa
Lichens of Asia
Lichens of Europe
Lichens of North America
Lichens of South America
Taxa named by James Dickson (botanist)